The LOT (License on Transfer) Network is a nonprofit organization that was formed to combat patent assertion entities (PAEs), also known as patent trolls, by cross-licensing patents that fall into the hands of PAEs.

Background 
LOT started as a Canon, Google and Red Hat-led initiative in 2014, and its founding members were mostly technology companies. Companies from other industries such as finance and automotive have joined the network to protect themselves from the growing threat of PAEs. As of July 2020, LOT Network had more than 750 members and close to 2.5 million patent assets. Notable members of LOT include Google, Red Hat, Uber, Ford, Dropbox, Mazda, General Motors, Honda, CBS, Netflix, JPMorgan Chase, SAP, Microsoft, Tesla, Alibaba, the Wikimedia Foundation, and IBM.

The number of patent disputes in the U.S. peaked in 2015, reaching 7,500 cases. According to Unified Patents, two-thirds of these cases were filed by patent trolls. A study out of Boston University found that patent litigation results in direct losses of about $60 billion every year in the U.S.

Underlying agreement 
LOT members agree to mutual non-aggression pact in which they pledge that none of their patents will ever be used by a patent troll to sue another member; however, members can still sell patents and sue other members. Cross-licensing of LOT member patents is subject to certain "triggering" events. A triggering event takes place when a patent passes to a PAE, including scenarios in which a LOT company becomes a PAE or is absorbed by a PAE. After the triggering event, the specific patents involved in the event are automatically cross-licensed to all LOT companies, blocking any potential legal action by a PAE. By pooling their patents, member companies provide immunity to one another and deter potential lawsuits from patent trolls. The group also benefits from a network effect: the more members that join, the more attractive membership becomes for other companies.

LOT members pay an annual fee for network membership. The annual fee depends on company revenues, but ranges from $1,500 to $20,000 per year (about the price of a single patent application). On September 1, 2016 LOT announced that it would waive annual membership fees until March 1, 2017 for companies with less than $5 million in annual revenues. This fee structure facilitates membership for startups and smaller companies, which are also targeted by PAEs. Over half of companies sued by PAEs make less than $10 million in revenue. In the event that a larger LOT member acquires a smaller member, the acquired company can pass on its patent license rights to its acquirer.

Reception 
While LOT helps prevent patent trolling, it does not address low patent quality or hinder companies that attack competitors to stall progress and gain a competitive advantage. Daniel Nazer, a staff attorney at the Electronic Frontier Foundation praised LOT but added a note of caution: “It’s a targeted program that’s good for limiting the supply of patents to the very worst actors who use litigation to shake down people for settlements, but it doesn’t stop problems with patent quality and with operating companies attacking each other.” The Electronic Frontier Foundation alleges that, ultimately, the patent system must be reformed to ensure that the U.S. Patent Office only grants patents for genuine inventions.

Intellectual Ventures, a well known PAE, alleges that by buying patents they create a market for invention, thereby helping to revitalize inefficient companies and make innovation profitable. Others, including Ira Blumberg – a former Rambus (a well-known PAE) employee – have countered that any value created by patent trolls is outweighed by settlement costs.

See also 
 Open Invention Network

References

External links 
 

Intellectual property organizations